Yater (Arabic: ياطر) is a Lebanese municipality located in Bint Jbeil District. It is 112 kilometers away from Beirut.

E. H. Palmer wrote that the name Yater came from a personal name.

History
The village once marked the northernmost extent of Jewish settlement upon their return from Babylonian exile in the 4th century BCE, and is mentioned in the 3rd century Mosaic of Rehob.

In 1852,  Edward Robinson visited and found "some few remains of antiquity", including two excavated chambers at the south of the village.

In 1875 Victor Guérin found Yater to have 160  Metawileh inhabitants. He further said that the ancient name of Yater must have been Yattir  or Jether; "Two other rocky hills, situated, the first to the south, the second to the south-west of this village, served as cemeteries to the ancient city. All the stones with which it was built were taken from this place. Vast quarries, cisterns, presses, and tombs, have been cut in the sides and on the summits of these hills, which are separated by a narrow valley. The greater contained each nine loculi, grouped three to left, and at the end under a vaulted arcosolium. The facade of two among them is pierced by several small niches, some designed for simple lamps, others for statuettes. One of these caves seems to have been set aside for some sacred purpose." 

According to the SWP: "There are three rock-cut tombs, with side loculi and kokim, at this village; one of these has an olive-press inside. The rock is much quarried round, and the place has the appearance of having been an ancient site. There is also a rock-cut wine-press and ruined birkeh. To the north-west there are two ruined watch-towers, with rough-hewn stones. To the north there is another similar, with a cistern." 

In 1881, the PEF's Survey of Western Palestine (SWP)  described it as: "A stone village, containing about 300  Metawileh, situated on hill-top, with olives and arable land about, having a birket and many cisterns and a spring near it."

During the Israeli occupation of southern Lebanon, 15 September 1991, two gunmen ambushed a Nepali UNIFIL patrol near Yater. One Nepali soldier was killed and another wounded. One of the gunmen was killed by return fire while the other escaped.

The Israeli Army occupied Yater and neighbouring Kafra, 20 February 1992, in a 24 hour incursion, backed by tanks, helicopters and heavy artillery. Around 100 buildings were destroyed, including a mosque, school and community center. Two Israeli soldiers were killed during the offensive and a young girl was killed in northern Israel by a subsequent rocket attack. 

On 22 February 1993 a Nepali soldier serving with UNIFIL was killed by Israeli artillery fire near Yater. Two years later, 20 March 1995, another Nepali soldier was also killed and three others wounded by Israeli shelling in the same area.

Two men installing a water tank on top of a house in Yater were killed by an Israeli missile on 30 March 1996. Hizbollah responded by firing rockets into northern Israel. It was one of the incidents in the build-up to Operation Grapes of Wrath the following month which caused massive destruction across all of the south of Lebanon.

Notable people
Ali Al-Kourani (born 1944) Shia scholar & cleric
Hossein Korani Ameli (1955-2019) one of founders of Hizbullah

References

Bibliography

External links 
Survey of Western Palestine, Map 4: IAA, Wikimedia commons 
Yater, Localiban

Populated places in the Israeli security zone 1985–2000
Populated places in Bint Jbeil District
Shia Muslim communities in Lebanon